Taking the Heat is a 1993 American romantic thriller film that premiered on Showtime. Directed by Tom Mankiewicz and written by Dan Gordon from a story by Gary Hoffman, the film followed a female cop and a murder witness as they try to avoid the mob en route to a high profile trial in New York City. The cast included Tony Goldwyn and Lynn Whitfield as the leads and George Segal, Will Patton, Peter Boyle, Joe Grifasi, Alan Arkin, and Greg Germann in supporting roles.

Cast
Tony Goldwyn... Michael
Lynn Whitfield... Carolyn Hunter
George Segal... Kepler
Will Patton... Hadley
Peter Boyle... Judge
Joe Grifasi... Lou Valentine
Alan Arkin... Tommy Canard
Greg Germann... Asst. D.A. Kennedy

References

External links

1993 television films
1993 thriller films
1993 films
American romantic thriller films
Films set in New York City
Showtime (TV network) films
1990s English-language films
1990s American films